All the Great Hits can refer to:

All the Great Hits (Diana Ross album)
All the Great Hits (Jimmy Buffett album)
All the Great Hits (Commodores album)